The AARP Movies for Grownups Award for Best Director is one of the AARP Movies for Grownups Awards presented annually by the AARP since the awards' inception in 2002. The award honors the best director over the age of fifty. The Best Director Award is one of the seven original trophies issued by AARP the Magazine, along with awards for Best Movie for Grownups, Best Actor, Best Actress, Best Foreign Film, Best Documentary, and Best Movie for Grownups Who Refuse to Grow Up.

Winners and Nominees

2000s

2010s

2020s

Multiple wins and nominations

Multiple wins

Multiple nominations

See also
 Academy Award for Best Director
 Golden Globe Award for Best Director
 BAFTA Award for Best Direction
 Directors Guild of America Award for Outstanding Directing – Feature Film
 Critics' Choice Movie Award for Best Director
 Independent Spirit Award for Best Director

References

Awards for best director
Director